Olbrachcice  is a village in the administrative district of Gmina Wschowa, within Wschowa County, Lubusz Voivodeship, in western Poland.

References

Villages in Wschowa County